WNOP is a radio station located in Newport, Kentucky, that can be heard in and around the Cincinnati area. It now broadcasts for Cincinnati's Catholic community and archdiocesan base and is an affiliate of EWTN radio for most (if not all) of its programming.

WNOP was a jazz station for 38 years, except for a brief run as a CNN Headline News affiliate from 1992 to 1994. WNOP's current religious talk format started on December 31, 2000,

History

Startup
The station was first on the air with a combined country music and pre-recorded radio shows, receiving its Federal Communications Commission (FCC) license on May 29, 1947. The first broadcasts were on August 21, 1948. Jimmie Skinner hosted a radio program, which featured singer Connie Hall.

Jazz era (1962–2000)

Despite its relatively weak signal (not to mention almost bumping right into AM powerhouse WLW), WNOP had a core audience of loyal listeners during the years when its musical programming was mostly jazz. Its studios were on Monmouth St., in Newport, Kentucky where Ty Williams bravely played music during a studio fire.  From there they moved to the "Jazz Ark' - floating studios on the Ohio river.  It wasn't all jazz, however —sometimes, breaks between songs were filled with recordings of stand-up comedians. For the favorite comedy cuts the punch lines would be saved to a Gates ST-101 Spot Tape machine.  They could be played as the DJ felt appropriate anytime between music tracks, or commercial VO.

From Monmouth St. the station moved to studios that were a tiny floating facility on the Ohio River, called "the jazz ark." Also known as "Free and Floating WNOP", the studios consisted of three 20,000-gallon fuel drums welded together with crosswalks and outfitted with all the necessary gear.

Unique for its time and place, the station maintained an on-air irreverence that could jolt you without warning. For instance, it sometimes identified itself as being "just a little to the right of WLW," while at other times, it claimed to be "Radio Free Newport," and Shelly Berman would often announce the call sign "WNOP - We're North Of Paraguay". On winter days when Cincinnati was hit with large amounts of snow and most stations announced school and workplace closings, morning on-air personality Leo Underhill instead would inform listeners which bars were closed due to bad weather.

Sacred Heart Radio (2000–present)

Sacred Heart Radio assumed ownership of the station on January 1, 2001. The program format was changed from Jazz to religious talk radio....much of it coming from EWTN Global Catholic Radio. The last song played before the switch was "The Vatican Rag" by Tom Lehrer.

The Son Rise Morning Show which airs weekday mornings on EWTN Radio originates from WNOP's studios which are now located at Our Lady of the Holy Spirit Center (the former St. Gregory's Seminary) at 5440 Moeller Avenue in Norwood.

On August 24, 2010 WHSS, 89.5 MHz in Hamilton, was sold by the Hamilton City Schools to Sacred Heart Radio. It is now an FM repeater of WNOP reaching the northern Cincinnati region of Hamilton, Middletown, Mason and the surrounding area.

In April 2016 Sacred Heart Radio Inc. purchased WPFB, 910 AM in Middletown from Northern Kentucky University to serve Middletown and the Dayton area. On June 3, 2016 WPFB commenced Sacred Heart Radio's programming.

On-air talent

Talent prior to 1962 (country music era)
 Bob Anderson, sportscaster
 Roy Moss
 Jimmie Skinner

On-air staff (1962–2000)
 Marc T. Bolin
 "Downtown" Scott Brown
 The Darksoldier (Phil Tucker)
 Jim Edwards
 Robyn Carey (Allgeyer)
 Angelo Catanzaro
 Jack Clements
 Val Coleman
 Dee Felice
 Kristi Heitzman
 Gary Keegan
 Wilbert Longmire
 Dennis "The Ironman" Michaels
 Bob NaveDa
 Geoff Nimmo
 Dick Pike
 Jim Planky
 Mike Roberts
 John Royer
 Brian Schwab 
 Ray Scott
 Jean Shepherd
 Mark Stevens (Mark Schlachter)
 Bunky Tadwell (Walt Harrell)
 Oscar Treadwell
 Leo (Old Undies) Underhill
 Chris Wagner
 Max Warner
 Christopher Geisen
 Stew Williams
 Ty Williams
 Dave Worford
 Carmen "Catman" Catanzaro
 Candy McGinnis
• Scott McKay (Scott Marinoff)

On-air talent (after 2001)
 Brian Patrick
 Bill Levitt
 Anna Mitchell
 Matt Swaim
 Paul Lachmann
 Rev. Rob Jack

References

External links

NOP
Catholic radio stations
Radio stations established in 1948
1948 establishments in Ohio
Newport, Kentucky